Vice Admiral Harley Hannibal Christy (18 September 1870 – 4 June 1950) served in the United States Navy during the Spanish–American War and World War I.

Biography
Christy was born in Circleville, Ohio and raised in Ashville, Ohio. He graduated from the U.S. Naval Academy in 1891.

Early career
In April 1898, at the start of the Spanish–American War, Christy was serving as an ensign aboard the cruiser  when she captured the ocean liner Catalina off Havana. The 1,000-ton ship was carrying a general cargo from New Orleans to Barcelona, and was valued at $600,000.

Christy was in command of two small gunboats during 1902, and was the Executive Officer of the armored cruiser  in 1910.

World War I
Christy was promoted to captain on 23 May 1917, and commanded the protected cruiser  from 7 July to 17 August. Two days later, on 19 August, Christy was placed in command of the armored cruiser , engaged in transporting and escorting troops and supplies to European ports.

The crew abandoned ship, and the San Diego rolled over and sank within half an hour. Six men were killed and three injured.

Christy was awarded the Distinguished Service Medal for his service while in command of San Diego and Wyoming.

Post-war
In 1920 Christy was stationed at the Naval Air Station Pensacola, Florida, where he was station commander. He was detached from that duty on 23 May 1923 and replaced Captain Lucius A. Bostwick as commander of the battleship .

On 2 December 1924 Christy was promoted to rear admiral. Christy subsequently held several flag commands ashore and afloat, as well as serving at the Naval War College and with the General Board and other Navy boards in Washington D.C.

Christy retired from active duty in October 1934, and in January 1950 was advanced to the rank of vice admiral on the Retired List in honor of his combat awards.

Christy died on 4 June 1950, and is buried at the United States Naval Academy Cemetery in Annapolis, Maryland.

Error
This should read from 1923 to 1924.

See also

References

External links
 

1870 births
1950 deaths
United States Navy personnel of World War I
People from Circleville, Ohio
United States Naval Academy alumni
United States Navy vice admirals
Recipients of the Navy Distinguished Service Medal
Burials at Arlington National Cemetery
People from Ashville, Ohio
Burials at the United States Naval Academy Cemetery